Preston Meyer Ward (July 24, 1927 – June 2, 2013) was an American professional baseball first baseman who appeared in 744 games over nine seasons in Major League Baseball (MLB) between 1948 and 1959 for the Brooklyn Dodgers, Chicago Cubs, Pittsburgh Pirates, Cleveland Indians and Kansas City Athletics. Ward was born in Columbia, Missouri, and attended Missouri State University. His professional career began in the Brooklyn farm system in 1944 when he was 16 years old.

Over the course of his MLB tenure, he became a utilityman and platoon player, seeing most of his action as a first baseman (438 games at first base vs. 95 in the outfield and 74 at third base). He batted .253 lifetime, while the league average for his era was .269. He collected 522 career hits, with 83 doubles, 15 triples, 50 home runs and 262 runs batted in. His highest seasonal home run total was 12, and his highest RBI total was 48. In  Ward batted .284 with 118 hits in a season split between the Indians and Athletics.

Ward was drafted by the St. Louis Bombers of the Basketball Association of America in 1949 out of Missouri State, but never played for them.

References

External links

1927 births
2013 deaths
American men's basketball players
Baseball players from Missouri
Brooklyn Dodgers players
Chicago Cubs players
Cleveland Indians players
Danville Dodgers players
Fort Worth Cats players
Kansas City Athletics players
Major League Baseball first basemen
Missouri State Bears basketball players
Newport News Dodgers players
Pittsburgh Pirates players
Pueblo Dodgers players
St. Louis Bombers (NBA) draft picks
San Diego Padres (minor league) players
Sportspeople from Columbia, Missouri
Zanesville Dodgers players
American military personnel of the Korean War